Sabera Nazneen Rahman  is a geneticist who specialises in cancer research and is a non-executive director for Astra Zeneca.  She was previously head of Genetics and Epidemiology at the Institute of Cancer Research.

Education
Rahman qualified in medicine from University of Oxford in 1991, and completed a PhD in Molecular Genetics in 1999 on the Wilms' tumor susceptibility gene FWT1. She completed her Certificate of Completion of Specialist Training in Clinical Genetics in 2001.

Career and research
She was head of Genetics and Epidemiology at the Institute of Cancer Research, based at the Sir Richard Doll Building in Sutton. She specialises in research into the genetic mechanisms that cause cancer, particularly among groups with a predisposition to pediatric cancers or breast cancer.  Through her research, Professor Rahman has provided improved screening and treatment options for NHS patients, and also provides advice on rare cancer genetics to clinicians internationally. She blogs about her work at Harvesting the Genome.

Rahman held a clinical role as head of the cancer genetics service at The Royal Marsden and St George's Hospital in south west London.

Rahman resigned from her position following in October 2018 following upholding on independent investigation of a complaint of systematic bullying spanning 15 years from 44 of her current and former staff and students . Rahman also lost a £3.5-million grant from the Wellcome Trust.

In 2017 Rahman was appointed Non-Executive Director and member of the Science Committee at AstraZeneca Plc.

Awards and honours
Rahman was elected a Fellow of the Academy of Medical Sciences in 2010. Her nomination reads:

In April 2014, she was named as Britain's third most influential woman in the BBC Woman's Hour power list 2014. In February 2016, she was awarded the Services to Science & Engineering award at the British Muslim Awards.

She was appointed Commander of the Order of the British Empire (CBE) in the 2016 Birthday Honours for services to medical science.

Personal life

Rahman is also a singer-songwriter, with two albums and one EP released.

See also
British Bangladeshi
List of British Bangladeshis
Category:British geneticists
Category:Women geneticists

References

External links 

 
 
 

Living people
Year of birth missing (living people)
Place of birth missing (living people)
British Muslims
British people of Bangladeshi descent
British geneticists
Women geneticists
Cancer researchers
Alumni of the University of Oxford
Commanders of the Order of the British Empire
Fellows of the Academy of Medical Sciences (United Kingdom)